Erica Green may refer to:
Erica Green (cyclist) (born 1970), South African female cyclist
Murder of Erica Green, A three-year-old American murder victim